La Chapelle-Saint-Ursin is a commune in the Cher department in the Centre-Val de Loire region of France.

Geography
The A71 autoroute cuts across the middle of the commune’s territory.

Population

Sights
 The church of St. Ursin, dating from the twelfth century.

See also
Communes of the Cher department

References

Communes of Cher (department)